CurlON (formerly the Ontario Curling Association) is the governing body of curling in Southern Ontario. Northern Ontario is governed by the Northern Ontario Curling Association (NOCA). The CurlON sends a team to represent Team Ontario at all major Canadian Championships. The NOCA sends a separate team to all of these events.

CurlON was founded in 1875. It was renamed from the Ontario Curling Association in 2016.

Championships

Ontario Tankard

The Ontario Tankard is the provincial championship for men's curling. The winner represents Team Ontario at the Tim Hortons Brier.

Previous names:
Ontario Silver Tankard: 1927-1931 
1932: Round robin playoff between the winners of the Ontario Tankard, Canada Life Trophy and the Toronto Bonspiel.
1933: Winner was decided between a playoff between the winners of the Ontario Tankard and the Toronto Bonspiel.
Ontario Tankard: 1934-1937
British Consols: 1938-1979
Labatt Tankard: 1980-1985
Blue Light Tankard: 1986-1995
Nokia Cup: 1996-2003
Ontario Men's Curling Championship: 2004 
Kia Cup: 2005-2006
TSC Stores Tankard: 2007-2009
Ontario Men's Curling Championship: 2010
The Dominion Tankard: 2011-2013
Travelers Tankard: 2014
Recharge with Milk Tankard: 2015-2017
Dairy Farmers of Ontario Tankard: 2018
Ontario Curling Championships: 2019–present

Ontario Scotties Tournament of Hearts

The Ontario Scotties Tournament of Hearts is the provincial championship for women's teams. Unlike the Dominion Tankard, the Hearts included teams from both southern and northern Ontario until 2015. The winner of the Ontario Hearts goes on to play in the national championship. Because the national champion returns the previous years champion to the event, if that team is from Ontario, they cannot defend their provincial championship. The national championship has been running since 1962, but the provincial championship has existed since 1956.

U-21 (Juniors)

The U-21 provincial curling championships are held annually in early January. The tournament is for curlers 20 years old and younger. A men's tournament has been held since 1950 and the women's since 1972. The winning team represents Ontario at the Canadian Junior Curling Championships.

BrokerLink Mixed
National champions in bold.

Seniors
The Ontario Senior Championship is for curlers over 50. The winner represents Ontario at the Canadian Senior Curling Championships.

U18 (formerly Bantams)

This event is for curlers 17 and under.

Best Western Intermediates
The Ontario Intermediate Championship was for curlers over 40 (men's) and 35 (women's). It was discontinued after 2018.

Champion skips (1993–2018):

Masters
The Ontario Masters Championship is for curlers over 60. The winner represents Ontario at the Canadian Masters Curling Championships.

(winners since 1993)

Mixed Doubles Challenge
First instituted in 2013 to send a team to the inaugural National Mixed Doubles Championship.

Gore Mutual Schoolboy/girl
This event is the provincial school championship, and teams represent their secondary schools rather than clubs. The boys event has been held annually since 1948.
2019 schoolgirl champion: A. N. Myer Secondary School (Megan Ford)
2019 schoolboy champion: Fellowes High School (Cole Lyon)

Notable past champions
Scott McDonald, St. Thomas Aquinas Catholic Secondary School (2004)
Tim March, Sir Oliver Mowat CI (2005)
Patrick Janssen, Sir Oliver Mowat CI (2005)
Mark Bice, Northern Collegiate Institute and Vocational School (2002)
Steve Bice, Northern Collegiate Institute and Vocational School (2000)
Jason Young, Lambton C.V.I. (1998)
Greg Balsdon, Don Mills Collegiate Institute (1995)
Dale Matchett, Bradford District High School (1994)
Pat Ferris, Sutton District High School (1993) 
Joe Frans, Smiths Falls District Collegiate Institute (1991)
Scott Patterson, Fellowes High School (1987)
Daryl Shane, John Diefenbaker Secondary School (1978)
Paul Savage, Don Mills Collegiate Institute (1965)

Wheelchair Championship
This is a mixed event, featuring wheelchair curling.

Champions:
2023: Jon Thurston, King C.C.
2022: Not held
2020: Cancelled
2019: Jim Armstrong, City View C.C.
2018: Chris Rees, Toronto Cricket
2017: Mike Munro, Ilderton C.C. 
2016: Chris Rees, Toronto Cricket
2015: Chris Rees, Peterborough C.C.
2014: Mike Munro, Ilderton C.C. 
2013: Ken Gregory, Bradford & District C.C.
2012: Mark Ideson, Ilderton C.C.
2011: Chris Rees, Toronto Cricket
2010: Bruce Cameron, RA Centre
2009: Ken Gregory, Bradford & District C.C.
2008: Chris Rees, Leaside C.C.
2007: Chris Rees, Leaside C.C.
2006: Chris Rees, Leaside C.C.
2005: Ken Gregory, Toronto Cricket

Men's Fairfield Marriott/Women's Challenge
This event allowed more amateur curlers to win a provincial championship. Only two members of a team were allowed to have won a zone crest in any other event except for youth events. In addition, only two members of the team could have won the provincial event before. All zone winners went straight to a 32 team provincial championship. This event was cancelled after 2018.

Notable winners:
 2005 women's: Cathy Auld (St. George's Golf and Country Club)

Colts/Trophy
This event has historically disqualified the top teams in the province. In its final year, 2018, the winners qualified for the Ontario Tankard (men's) and the Ontario Scotties Tournament of Hearts (women's).

Notable past winners:
Sebastien Robillard (2018)
Chrissy Cadorin (2018)
Alison Goring (2014)
Mark Kean (2010) 
Kimberly Tuck (2005)
Jon St. Denis (2004)
Chad Allen (2002) 
Brent Ross (1997)
Adam Spencer (1994)
Nick Rizzo (1988)
Paul Savage (1968)

Junior Mixed
This event existed until 2016 and was replaced by the U21 Mixed Doubles championship. Competitors must be 20 years or younger as of December 31 of the previous year.

Past winners:

U21 Mixed Doubles

U18 Mixed
Previously known as Bantam Mixed

2019 champions: Jordan McNamara, Alyssa Blad, Maxime Daigle, Laura Smith

Notable past winners:
2013: Jeff Wanless, Jestyn Murphy, Hale Murphy, Leah Will
2012: Sarah Nuhn, John Willsey, Hilary Nuhn, Jean-Michel Barrette
2011: Jason Camm
2010: Tyler Sagan, Carly Howard, Jason Camm, Joan Moore
2009: Richard Krell 
2008: Lynn Kreviazuk
2003: Rob Bushfield, Rachel Homan, Alex Coon, Alison Kreviazuk
2002: Chris Gardner
1998: Bobby Reid, Megan Balsdon, Mark Stanfield, Kelly Cochrane

Senior Mixed
Mixed curling for male curlers over 50 and female curlers over 45.

Notable past champions:
2017: Rob Lobel
2013, 2015 & 2022: Rick Thurston

Silver Tankard

In this event, each club that enters has two teams, who compete against other clubs, and scores are totalled in aggregate form. Regional and zone playdowns are single-knock out rather than double. It is the oldest of the O.C.A. events, dating back to 1875. The women's event has been held since 1914.

The event served as a provincial championship from 1927 to 1931 with a team selected from with winning club representing Ontario at the Brier. In 1932 and 1933, the winner entered a playoff to go to the Brier, and from 1934 to 1937, the winner of the Brier trophy event of the Tankard went to the Brier.

In 2022, the event format changed, with the men's and women's events being merged into one. The event is still a double rink event, except one team must be a men's team, and the other a women's team. 

Champion clubs since 1992:

Curling Club Championship

Champions

Grand Masters
This event is for curlers over the age of 70. The event is an open event, that women and men may enter. It began in 2007.

Winners:
2007: Peter Barker
2008: Al Boyle
2009: Garry Holmes
2010: Peter Barker
2011: Austin Palmer
2012: Rod Matheson
2013: Art Leganchuk
2014: Bob Edmondson
2015: Benny Brock
2016: Ron Perrier
2017: Gerard Gidding
2018: Bob Edmondson
2019: Don Moseley-Williams
2020–22: Cancelled due to the COVID-19 pandemic
2023: Ted Hellyer

Provincial Stick Bonspiel
In this event, curlers must use a "stick" to throw the rock. "Sticks" are usually used by disabled and elderly athletes unable to throw the rock by sliding along the ice. The event began in 2007.

Winners:
2007: Del Hicke
2008: Harold Peltzer
2009: Harold Peltzer
2010: Ed Ferguson
2011: Bruce Jeffrey
2012: Bruce Jeffrey
2013: Carl Glatt
2014: Carl Glatt
2015: Bruce Jeffrey
2016: Hugh Chesser
2017: Bruce Folkard
2019: Bruce Gillespie
2020: cancelled
2022: Rick Thurston

Two-person
2019: Ron Scheckenberger/Ken Mattis
2020: Ron Scheckenberger/Ken Mattis
2022: Jim Armstrong/Ian Gray
2023: Morris Anderson/Wayne Shea

Elementary School Championship
This event is open to elementary school students of any gender. Teams represent their elementary schools. The event began in 1993.

Past winners:
Tanner Horgan, MacLeod Public School (2012)

Ontario Parasport Games
Winners:

2006: Bruce Cameron (RA Centre)
2008: Chris Daw (Bradford)
2010: Ken Gregory (Bradford)
2012: Ken Gregory (Bradford)

Ontario Winter Games

Winners:

Men's
2002: Mike Anderson (Bayview)
2004: Shane Latimer (Winchester)
2006: Neil Sinclair (Manotick) 
2008: Richard Krell (St. Thomas)
2010: Ben Bevan (Annandale)
2012: Doug Kee (Sarnia)
2014: Matthew Hall (Stroud)
2016: Cancelled
2018: Josh Leung (Whitby)
2020: Dylan Niepage (Coldwater)

Women's
2002: Laura Payne (Prescott)
2004: Hollie Nicol (Bayview)
2006: Rachel Homan (City View)
2008: Crystal Lillico (Winchester)
2010: Lauren Horton (Huntley)
2012: Krysta Burns (Idylwylde)
2014: Megan Smith (Sudbury)
2016: Cancelled
2018: Rachel Steele (Port Perry)
2020: Emily Deschenes (Manotick)

Wheelchair
2012: Chris Rees (Toronto Cricket)
2014: Chris Rees (Peterborough)
2018: ?
2020: Carl Bax

Mixed doubles
2018: ?
2020: Mychelle Zahab & Sam Mooibroek

See also
List of curling clubs in Ontario
Northern Ontario Curling Association
Ottawa Valley Curling Association
Toronto Curling Association

References

Sources
Soudog's Curling History Site
Curlingzone.com
Ontario Curling Association
Canadian Curling Association

Curling governing bodies in Canada
Sports governing bodies in Ontario
Curling in Ontario